Zhang Juncai (born 31 March 1966) is one of the world's tallest people, standing at least  tall. He is notable for visiting Yao Defen.

Biography
He is from Shanxi Province, China. He went to the hospital in April 2009, to visit his friend, the  tallest living woman Yao Defen.

References

1966 births
Living people
People from Xinzhou
People with gigantism